Cibenzoline (or cifenline) is a Class Ia antiarrhythmic. 

Pituxate & Ecipramidil are other gem-diphenyl cyclopropanyl drugs.

Imidazolines
Cyclopropanes